Primaveras is a band from Los Angeles, California. Originally named Julian Jasper and briefly known as Modern Howls, the band has been featured by Billboard, Magnetic Magazine, Consequence of Sound, PopMatters, and Paste/Daytrotter. Their songs have been licensed by the Freeform show Stitchers, the CBS show Wisdom of the Crowd, and Starbucks.

Band History 

Primaveras was founded in 2016 by multi-instrumentalist James Clifford as a psych-pop project while a student at the University of Southern California.

Discography 

 Julian Jasper EP (2017)
 Better Off - single (2018)
Can't Undo My Love - single (2018)
 Echoes in the Well of Being LP - (2018)

References

External links 
  official band website

American indie rock groups
Musical groups established in 2016
2016 establishments in California